Donald Morrison may refer to:
 Donald Morrison (missionary) (1828–1869), Canadian missionary
 Donald Morrison (outlaw) (1858–1894), Canadian outlaw
 Donald Morrison (politician) (1852–1920), merchant and political figure in the Province of New Brunswick, Canada
 Donald M. Morrison, United States Coast Guard admiral
 Don Morrison (ice hockey) (1923–2001), ice hockey player
 Don Morrison (American football) (born 1949), former American football offensive tackle
 Don Morrison (mountaineer) (1929–1977), British climber and mountaineer

See also
 Donald Morison (1857–1924), Newfoundland lawyer, judge and politician